Gloucester is a former municipality and now geographic area of Ottawa, Ontario, Canada. Located east of Ottawa's inner core, it was an independent city until amalgamated with the Regional Municipality of Ottawa–Carleton in 2001 to become the new city of Ottawa. The population of Gloucester is about 150,012 people (2021 Census).

History
Gloucester, originally known as Township B, was established in 1792. The first settler in the township was Braddish Billings in what is now the Billings Bridge area of Ottawa. In 1800, the township became part of Russell County, and later Carleton County in 1838. In 1850, the area was incorporated as Gloucester Township, named after Prince William Frederick, Duke of Gloucester and Edinburgh. Over the years, parts of Gloucester Township were annexed by the expanding city of Ottawa. Gloucester was incorporated as a city in 1981 and became part of the amalgamated city of Ottawa in 2001.

Town Halls
1872—1962: Bank Street in Billings Bridge
1962—1996: Bank Street in Leitrim
1996—2001: Telesat Court in Pineview

Reeves

Mayors
1981-1982 Elizabeth Stewart
1982-1984 Fred G. Barrett
1984-1985 Mitch Owens
1985-1991 Harry Allen
1991-2001 Claudette Cain

Demographics

Communities and neighbourhoods

Education
Anglophone secular public schools are operated by the Ottawa-Carleton District School Board. Anglophone Catholic public schools are operated by the Ottawa Catholic School Board. French secular public schools are operated by the Conseil des écoles publiques de l'Est de l'Ontario (CÉPEO). The Conseil des écoles catholiques du Centre-Est (CECCE), formerly known as the Conseil des écoles catholiques de langue française du Centre-Est (CECLFCE), operates the French Catholic public schools.

The CECCE has its headquarters in Gloucester. The predecessor school district, the Conseil des écoles catholiques de langue française de la région d'Ottawa-Carleton (CECLF), had its headquarters in the current CECCE headquarters.

Collège La Cité is the only post-secondary institution in Gloucester.

Places of interest

Parks
The Greenbelt
Mer Bleue Bog

Shopping
Billings Bridge Shopping Centre
Gloucester Centre
Place d'Orleans
South Keys Shopping Centre

Museums
Billings Estate National Historic Site
Canada Science and Technology Museum

See also

List of townships in Ontario

References

Bibliography

 Gloucester Roots, L. Kemp (1991)

Neighbourhoods in Ottawa
Former municipalities now in Ottawa
Former cities in Ontario
Hudson's Bay Company trading posts
1792 establishments in Upper Canada
Populated places disestablished in 2000
2000 disestablishments in Ontario